Ilhaq (rus.  Илхак uzb. Ilhaq) is a 2020 Uzbek military drama directed and written by Jahongir Akhmedov. The Film Agency of Uzbekistan acted as the general producer of the film. The film is the first joint project with the "Belarusfilm" studio. According to the creators of the film, the script is based on the work of Zulfiya Zokirova "Life". The picture tells about the resilience of a mother who lost five children during the Great Patriotic War. Starring Dilorom Karimova, Tahir Saidov, Dilrabo Mirzayeva Fotik Nasimov and Husan Rashidov. The tape was released on May 9, 2020.

The premiere of the film "Ilhak", based on the events of life, is dedicated to the 75th anniversary of the Great Patriotic War, took place on May 9, 2020, on all TV channels of Uzbekistan, including «Sevimli TV», «MY5», «Zoʻr TV», «Milliy TV». The film was the first in Uzbekistan to be released in theaters after restrictions due to the COVID-19 pandemic.

Plot 
The film "Ilhak" is based on real events. The basis was a story from the life of Zulfiya Zokirova during the Second World War. Zulfiya sends all her sons to war, but they all die. Four of them had wives who later never remarried. Zulfiya will hope for the rest of her life that her children will return, even though she receives black letters.

Creation 
The film "Ilhak" was created specifically by order of the Cinematography Agency of Uzbekistan in 2019 for the 75th anniversary of the Great Patriotic War.

The shooting of the film was entrusted to the film company "EZGU Film". The most famous cultural figures of Uzbekistan and Belarus acted as actors.

The atmosphere of the era of that time was revived at the film site "EZGU Film". In cooperation with a creative team from Belarus, scenery was built on 5 hectares of land: cities and battlefields. World War II buildings were erected and houses typical of the period were built.

Cast 

 Dilorom Karimova - Zulfiya Zokirova
 Dilrabo Mirzaeva - Hidoyat
 Fotik Nasimov — Muxammajon Xolmatov
 Ma’rifat Ortiqova – Lazokat
 Dilnavoz Axmedova - Hamroniso
 Toxir Saidov - Mardon Rais
 Ra'no Zokirova - Nazira
 Xusan Rashidov - Vahobjon Xolmatov
 Bunyod Rahmatullaev - Yusufjon Xolmatov
 Iskandar Elmurodov - Ahmadjon Xolmatov
 Yigitali Mamajonov  - Shokir
 Viktor Bogushevich
 Alla Poplavskaya
 Lolita Toborko
 Ilona Raenko
 Dmitriy Mashko
 Gennadiy Churikov
 Ekaterina Ermalovich
 Konstantin Pronkin
 Mixail Kaminskiy
 Nikita Kratovich
 Aleksandr Orlovskiy
 Aleksandr Tkachenok

Sound post-production 
Sound director Anvar Fayzullayev. Sound design Donyor Agzamov. CineLab sound post-production complex.  Dolby Digital 5.1

Music 
The music for the film "Ilhaq" was written Donyor Agzamov.

Awards and nominations 

 Winner of the Grand Prix of the International Film Festival "Falling Leaves" (for the film "Ilhak") (2021) 
 Winner in the nomination "Best Film" of the National Film Festival "Oltin Khumo" (2021) 
 Winner in the nomination "Best Sound Engineer" of the National Film Festival "Oltin Khumo" (2021) (Anvar Fayzullaev)

References

External links 

 

Uzbek-language films